This is a list of members of the Australian House of Representatives of the 29th Parliament of Australia (1974–1975) as elected on 18 May 1974. It convened on 12 June 1974, and ended on 11 November 1975. On 18 May 1974 a double dissolution of both Houses was held.  All 127 seats in the House of Representatives, and all 60 seats in the Senate were up for election.  The incumbent Australian Labor Party led by Prime Minister of Australia Gough Whitlam defeated the opposition Liberal Party of Australia led by Billy Snedden and Coalition partner the Country Party led by Doug Anthony.

Members 

1 Labor member Lance Barnard resigned on 2 June 1975; Liberal candidate Kevin Newman won the resulting by-election on 28 June 1975.

Leadership

Presiding officer

Majority leadership (Labor)

Minority leadership (Liberal–Country)

Partisan mix of the House by state and territory

References

Members of Australian parliaments by term
20th-century Australian politicians